Chirundi may refer to:

 Chirundu, Zambia
 Chirundu, Zimbabwe